Balashovsky District is an administrative and municipal district (raion), one of the thirty-eight in Saratov Oblast, Russia. It is located in the west of the oblast. Its administrative center is the town of Balashov (which is not administratively a part of the district). Population: 31,125 (2010 Census);

Administrative and municipal status
Within the framework of administrative divisions, Balashovsky District is one of the thirty-eight in the oblast. The town of Balashov serves as its administrative center, despite being incorporated separately as a town under oblast jurisdiction—an administrative unit with the status equal to that of the districts.

As a municipal division, the district is incorporated as Balashovsky Municipal District, with Balashov Town Under Oblast Jurisdiction being incorporated within it as Balashov Urban Settlement.

References

Notes

Sources

Districts of Saratov Oblast

